Puentes Viejas ("Old Bridges") is a municipality of the Community of Madrid, Spain.

Puentes Viejas was formed in 1975 by combining together three existing municipalities: Manjirón (which absorbed the Cinco Villas municipality in 1850), Paredes de Buitrago and Serrada de la Fuente.  The name of the newly created municipality came from the nearby reservoir called Puentes Viejas.

References

Municipalities in the Community of Madrid